S. S. Kolkebail ( Sanjeeva Shetty Kolkebail) was a lawyer from Kundapur hailed from a prominent bunt family Kolkebail. He became the Member of Legislative Assembly of Madras Government in 1952. He was the member of "Composition of the House Committee" from 1952 to 1957. He represented Bhramavar and Kundapur Constituencies and was MLA for 3 terms.

References 
 Legislative Assembly bios

Year of birth missing (living people)
Possibly living people
20th-century Indian politicians
Members of the Tamil Nadu Legislative Assembly